is a small near-Earth object that should have passed within  of Earth in 2022. On 5 February 2022 the 2009 observations were remeasured greatly reducing the odds of an impact. On 6 May 2022 it had a 1-in-140,000 chance of impacting Earth. It is estimated to be 10-meters in diameter which would make it smaller than the Chelyabinsk meteor. It has a very short observation arc of 1.2 days and has not been observed since 2009. On 6 May 2022 it was nominally expected to be  from Earth but has an uncertainty region of ±. The nominal Earth approach was 15 May 2022 and would have had the asteroid only brightening to apparent magnitude 26 which would have made it too faint for automated surveys to detect. With a Palermo scale rating of -4.41, the odds of impact were  times less than the background hazard level for an asteroid of this size.

About two months after approaching Earth, it came to perihelion (closest approach to the Sun), but the time of perihelion passage is only known with an accuracy of ±3 days. The asteroid was not recovered due to its small size and distance from Earth.

See also

References

External links 
 
 
 

Minor planet object articles (unnumbered)
Discoveries by MLS
Near-Earth objects removed from the Sentry Risk Table
20090504